The men's tournament of Ice hockey at the 1999 Asian Winter Games at Gangneung, South Korea, was held from 30 January to 6 February 1999.

Results
All times are Korea Standard Time (UTC+09:00)

Preliminary round

Group A

Group B

5th place match

Final round
 The results and the points of the matches between the same teams that were already played during the preliminary round shall be taken into account for the final round.

Final standing

References 

Results

Men